Kevin Scott Murphy (born 1970 in Dartmouth, Nova Scotia) is a Canadian politician, who was elected to the Nova Scotia House of Assembly in the 2013 provincial election. A member of the Nova Scotia Liberal Party, he represented the electoral district of Eastern Shore from 2013 to 2021. On October 24, 2013, Murphy was elected Speaker of the House of Assembly of Nova Scotia.

Murphy owns Shop the Shore, a community and business publication. He was paralyzed during a hockey game when he was 14 years old and became a paraplegic as a result.

Electoral record

|-

 

|-

|Liberal
|Kevin Murphy
|align="right"|3,770
|align="right"|52.99
|align="right"|
|-

|New Democratic Party
|Sid Prest
|align="right"|1,922
|align="right"|27.01
|align="right"|
|-

|Progressive Conservative
|Steve Brine
|align="right"|1,423
|align="right"|20.00
|align="right"|
|}

References

Living people
Nova Scotia Liberal Party MLAs
People from the Halifax Regional Municipality
Canadian politicians with disabilities
Speakers of the Nova Scotia House of Assembly
1970 births
21st-century Canadian politicians